Stine Nielsen (born 9 February 1991) is a Danish sports shooter. She competed in the Women's 10 metre air rifle and women's 50 m 3 positions events at the 2012 and 2016 Summer Olympics.

She won the junior World title in the 50 m rifle 3 positions in 2010, and gold at the 2018 European Championships in the 10 m air rifle.  She won silver in the same event at the 2017 European Championships.

References

External links

Profile  at London2012.com
Profile at BBC Sport Olympics 2012
Profile at Sports Yahoo.com
Profile at www.NBColympics.com

1991 births
Living people
Danish female sport shooters
Olympic shooters of Denmark
Shooters at the 2012 Summer Olympics
Shooters at the 2016 Summer Olympics
People from Faaborg-Midtfyn Municipality
Shooters at the 2015 European Games
European Games silver medalists for Denmark
European Games medalists in shooting
ISSF rifle shooters
Shooters at the 2019 European Games
Sportspeople from the Region of Southern Denmark
21st-century Danish women